ROX is a Flemish children's superhero drama, produced by Studio 100. The show revolves around three young heroes with an exceptional talent and an exceptional car, ROX. The abbreviation ROX stands for Riding on OXygen but also for the names of the three heroes (Rick, Olivia and Xavier).
On Dec 9 2015 ROX made its cinema debut in the crossover film "Mega Mindy versus ROX.

Concept 
Three extraordinary, talented young heroes were selected by the government and brought together in an ultra-secret team. Their mission is to succeed where everyone fails. Their weapon: ROX.

Cast
 Rick: Jelle Florizoone (2011–2015)
 Olivia: Jana Geurts (2011–2015)
 Xavier: Jeremy Vandoorne (2011–2015)
 ROX: Chris Van den Durpel (voice) (2011–2015)
 Colonel: Frans Maas (2011–2015)
 Jozefien: Magda Cnudde (2012–2015)

References

External links 
 
 
 ROX on Studio100fan.eu

2011 Belgian television series debuts
Belgian children's television shows
Belgian drama television shows
2010s Belgian television series